The Vega de Tera disaster, (also known as the Ribadelago disaster [Catástrofe de Ribadelago]) was a flood that occurred on the early morning of January 9, 1959 in the Province of Zamora, Spain. The flood was caused by the failure of a dam, releasing water from the Vega de Tera reservoir. A total of 144 of the 664 residents in Ribadelago were killed. It was the first of two fatal dam failures in Europe that year; in December, the collapse of the Malpasset Dam resulted in over 400 fatalities.

Background
The Tera River basin located within Sanabria Lake Natural Park, is a geological horst, uplifted by the Cabrera Valley Fault in the north, and the Las Portillas Fault in the south. The horst is part of the Montes de León mountain range. The range consists of granite, gneiss and volcanic rocks. The dam was constructed over the  Tera River. It had a maximum capacity to hold  of water. It formed part of a larger system of artificial lakes and canals. The dam was managed by Hidroeléctrica Moncabril, a hydroelectric company.

Flood
The collapse released  of water from the Vega de Tera reservoir.

The time between hearing a loud roar as a result of the break and the subsequent torrent of water was insufficient for residents to escape. The surge carried along many tree trunks and debris. The force of the flood dragged victims into Sanabria Lake. More than 1,500 domesticated animals also died. Recovery teams were only able to recover 28 bodies from the lake. Given the remote location of the town and time of incident, the first assistance did not arrive until the following morning. Sanabria Lake rose by  after floodwater and sediments entered. Only 10–20% of the total sediment volume was deposited into the lake; most of it was deposited along the floodway in the Tera River gorge. Damage was minor downstream as the force of the flood weakened when it entered the lake.

Aftermath

The disaster led to the creation of Instruction for the Project, Construction and Exploitation of Large Dams by the Ministry of Public Works in 1962. A modified version of the law was introduced in 1967. The Dam Surveillance Service was also formed for the purpose of ensuring dam safety and regulations. In December 1959, seven workers from Hidroeléctrica Moncabril, and three from the company that constructed the dam were indicted by the Court of Valladolid. Eventually, only five individuals were convicted for reckless negligence without circumstances.

A trial was held in March 1963 in Zamora concluded that Hidroeléctrica Moncabril was to pay 19,378,732 pesetas. In a report published during the trial, a failure in the design of the dam led to disaster. Experts concluded that poor construction material which could not withstand increased water pressure during increased rainfall prior to January 9 was the reason for catastrophe. According to an eyewitness present during the construction of the dam, leaks occurred, which had to be controlled by measuring water in the reservoir. The Hidroeléctrica Moncabril was eventually absorbed by Unión Fenosa. The court of justice sentenced the then managing director of the company, two engineers and an expert as directly responsible for the works to one year in prison for the crime of reckless negligence. Subsequently, the sentence was appealed and the convicted were finally acquitted or pardoned by the state.

Over a period of several days after the flood, donations amounted to 12 million pesetas. Families of the dead were compensated with varying amounts of Euros depending on ages of the victims. For each deceased adult, € 600 was compenated. € 450 for victims over the age of 16, and € 300 for children below 10 years. Those who were injured received € 18. Many survivors migrated to Zamora and Benavente. The Instituto Nacional de Colonización received € 7,500 in compensation as well.

See also
 List of dam failures

References 

1959 floods in Europe
Floods in Spain
History of the province of Zamora
Geography of the Province of Zamora
Dam failures in Europe
1959 in Spain
Man-made disasters in Spain
1959 industrial disasters
1959 disasters in Spain